An emergency exit in a structure is a special exit for emergencies such as a fire: the combined use of regular and special exits allows for faster evacuation, while it also provides an alternative if the route to the regular exit is blocked.

The qualifications for an emergency exit are as follows: it must be in a location that is easily accessible, the exit must have an area or location that it can bring people to in the event of any emergency, it must be controlled by the inside of the building, it must be well managed and regularly up kept, and it must be in a permanent location.

It is usually in a strategically located (e.g. in a stairwell, hallway, or other likely places) outward opening door with a crash bar on it and with exit signs leading to it. A fire escape is a special kind of emergency exit, mounted to the outside of a building.

History

Following the events of the Victoria Hall disaster in Sunderland, England, in 1883 in which more than 180 children died because a door had been bolted at the bottom of a stairwell, the British government began legal moves to enforce minimum standards for building safety. This slowly led to the legal requirement that venues must have a minimum numbers of outward opening emergency exits as well as locks which could be opened from the inside.

These moves were not globally copied for some time. For example, in the United States, 146 factory workers died in the Triangle Shirtwaist Factory fire in 1911 when they were stopped by locked exits, and 492 people died in the Cocoanut Grove fire in a Boston nightclub in 1942. This led to regulations requiring that exits of large buildings open outward, and that enough emergency exits be provided to accommodate the building's capacity.

Similar disasters around the world also resulted in public fury and calls for changes to emergency regulations and enforcement. An investigation was launched by the Argentine federal government after 194 people were killed during the 2004 República Cromañón nightclub fire in Buenos Aires, Argentina. The emergency exits had been chained shut by the owners, to prevent people from sneaking into the nightclub without paying.

Buildings

Local building codes will often dictate the number of fire exits required for a building of a given size. This may include specifying the number of stairs. For any building bigger than a private house, modern codes invariably specify at least two sets of stairs. Furthermore, such stairs must be completely separate from each other. Some architects meet this requirement by housing two stairs in a "double helix" configuration where two stairs occupy the same floor space, intertwined. For old buildings that predate modern fire code requirements and lack space for a second staircase, having intertwining stairs so close to each other may allow firefighters going up and evacuees going down to use separate staircases. Westfield Stratford City uses this configuration in the Upper car park. This part of the building has eight storeys: LG, G and 1 are part of the shopping centre; 2 has some offices and a storage area; CP1, CP2, CP3 and CP4 are a multi-storey car park. The floors are served by the main public lifts and escalators, and by 1 set of a double-helix stairway and lift per 1000 square metres, going into the service areas. The main public escalators don't count as fire exits, as the doors may be locked during less busy periods. The building, therefore, has one fire exit per 4000m2 of floor space.

Knowing where the emergency exits are in buildings can save lives. Some buildings, such as schools, have fire drills to practice using emergency exits. Many disasters could have been prevented if people had known where fire escapes were and if emergency exits had not been blocked. For example, in the September 11, 2001, attacks on the World Trade Center, some of the emergency exits inside the building were inaccessible, while others were locked. In the Stardust Disaster and the 2006 Moscow hospital fire, the emergency exits were locked and most windows barred shut. In the case of the Station Nightclub, the premises was over capacity the night fire broke out, the front exit was not designed well (right outside the door, the concrete approach split 90 degrees and a railing ran along the edge), and an emergency exit swung inward, not outward as code requires.

In many countries, it is required that all new commercial buildings include well-marked emergency exits. Older buildings must be retrofitted with fire escapes. In countries where emergency exits are not standard, fires will often result in a much greater loss of life.

Signage

The UK Health and Safety (Safety Signs and Signals) Regulations 1996 define a fire safety sign as an illuminated sign or acoustic signal that provides information on escape routes and emergency exits. Well-designed emergency exit signs are necessary for emergency exits to be effective.

Fire escape signs usually display the word "EXIT" or the equivalent word in the local language with large, well-lit, green letters, or the green pictorial "running-man" symbol developed and adopted in Japan around 1980 and introduced in 2003 by ISO 7010. Pictorial green "running-man" sign is mandatory in Japan, European Union, South Korea, Australia, New Zealand and Canada, and increasingly becoming common elsewhere.

Some states in the United States currently require the exit signs to be colored red, despite the usage of color red in signage usually implies hazards, prohibited actions or stop, while the color green implies safe place/actions or to proceed. Older building code in Canada required red exit signs, but no new installation is allowed.

Emergency door release

An emergency door release call point (or a pull station in the United States) is used to disengage locking devices such as electromagnets, bolt locks, and electric locks while also ensuring positive security and failsafe operation.

Blocked exits

Firefighters have cited overzealous security guards who told people during a fire that they are not allowed to use emergency exits. The practice is actually quite common in the absence of fires, as well. Some skyscrapers have stairwells with standard emergency exit signs on each door, which then lock upon closing. Users of these stairwells are trapped, whether they do not know that the only door that opens from the inside is the one on the ground floor.

A further problem becoming very common in the USA (2005) is that retail stores at night close one of their main entrance/exits through makeshift heavy metal barriers, signage, paper notes, or junk placed in front of the exits. Some actually lock their exits. A large array of signage and mechanical exit systems have also been devised, including signage that says contradictorily, "This is not an exit", "Do not use this exit", or warning users that a heavy penalty will be assessed for non-emergency use.

Some systems do not allow the exit to be opened until the user signals the intention to exit (through a button or lever) for some amount of time, such as 20 seconds. It is also common for these exits to remain completely locked until somebody tests them.

Some have alarms activated when they are opened, to alert staff of unauthorized use during non-emergencies.  On many exits, the user may have to hold down a crash bar or other door opening device for a period of time to unlock the door. Many exits have a sign reading, 'emergency exit only, alarm will sound if opened', to warn of the fact that it is an emergency exit only.

Aircraft

In aircraft terms, an "exit" is any one of the main doors (entry doors on the port side of the aircraft and service doors on the starboard side) and an "emergency exit" is defined as a door that is only ever used in an emergency (such as overwing exits and permanently armed exits). Passengers seated in exit rows may be called upon to assist and open exits in the event of an emergency.

The number and type of exits on an aircraft is regulated through strict rules within the industry, and is based on whether the aircraft is single or twin-aisled; the maximum passenger load; and the maximum distance from a seat to an exit. The goal of these regulations is to make possible the evacuation of an airliner's designed maximum occupancy of passengers and crew within 90 seconds even if half of the available exits are blocked.

Any aircraft where the emergency exit door sill height is above that which would make unaided escape possible is fitted with an automatic inflatable evacuation slide, which allows occupants to slide to the ground safely.

† 9 passenger aircraft only

Ventral exits must allow the same rate of egress as a Type I exit, tailcone exit are aft of the fuselage.

In November 2019, the EASA allowed 'Type-A+' exits with a dual-lane evacuation slide to increase maximum accommodation increased to 480 seats up from 440 with four pairs of doors on the A350-1000, and up to 460 on the A330-900.

Gallery

References

External links

 Information on fire exit signs in Britain

Architectural elements
Construction law
Safety